National Route 443 is a national highway of Japan connecting Ōkawa, Fukuoka and Hikawa, Kumamoto in Japan, with a total length of 124.9 km (77.61 mi).

References

National highways in Japan
Roads in Fukuoka Prefecture
Roads in Kumamoto Prefecture